Paeonia daurica subsp. macrophylla is from the western Caucasus in Georgia, growing between 800 and 1000 m. It was formerly regarded as a separate species, Paeonia macrophylla, but in 2002, the Chinese botanist Hong Deyuan reduced it to a subspecies of Paeonia daurica. It grows on rocky slopes and in alpine valleys. Its leaves are a dark green and flowers are white tinged with yellow, produced in late spring or early summer.

References

daurica subsp. macrophylla
Plant subspecies